Michael James Owen Pallett (born September 7, 1979) is a Canadian composer, violinist, keyboardist, and vocalist. Under their erstwhile moniker of Final Fantasy, Pallett won the 2006 Polaris Music Prize for the album He Poos Clouds. Pallett is also known for their contributions to Arcade Fire, having toured with the band and been credited as an arranger and instrumentalist on each of their studio albums. In January 2014, Pallett and Arcade Fire member William Butler were nominated for Best Original Score at the 86th Academy Awards for their original score of the film Her (2013).

From the age of 3, Pallett studied classical violin, and composed their first piece at age 13. A notable early composition includes some of the music for the game Traffic Department 2192; Pallett moved on to scoring films, to composing two operas while in university. Apart from the indie music scene, Pallett has had commissions from the Barbican, Toronto Symphony Orchestra, National Ballet of Canada, Bang on a Can, Ecstatic Music Festival, the Vancouver CBC Orchestra, and Fine Young Classicals. They have been noted for their live performances, wherein Pallett plays the violin into a loop pedal; Pallett uses Max/MSP and SooperLooper to do multi-phonic looping, which sends their violin signal to amplifiers across the stage.

Aside from their solo oeuvre and work with Arcade Fire, Pallett has contributed arrangements and instrumentation to the works of pop acts like Duran Duran, Pet Shop Boys, Robbie Williams, Taylor Swift and Ed Sheeran, as well as rock performers such as R.E.M., Linkin Park, Franz Ferdinand, the National and Alex Turner.

Career

Solo work 
Pallett has drawn inspiration from electronic act Orchestral Manoeuvres in the Dark (OMD), who were Pallett's favorite band, along with Eurythmics. They have also identified albums by Tori Amos, The Strokes, Public Enemy and Brian Eno as influential. The name Final Fantasy, under which Pallett recorded prior to the release of Heartland, was a tribute to the well-known video game series, although Pallett said that it is not one of their top twenty favorite games.

Pallett's debut album, Has a Good Home, was released on February 12, 2005, by the Blocks Recording Club, a cooperative, Toronto-based record label of which Pallett is a founding member. "An Arrow in the Side of Final Fantasy" borrows the music from the Space Zone's final level in Super Mario Land 2: 6 Golden Coins. "Adventure.exe" from this album was used in a series of 2006 commercials by Orange in the United Kingdom. Pallett did not intend to sell the song for this purpose, but its use was authorized due to an alleged miscommunication with their record label, Tomlab. All of Pallett's income from this use is donated to Doctors Without Borders.

Pallett's second album, He Poos Clouds, was released in June 2006, though the video, directed by Jesse Ewles, was released on March 1, 2006. The album consists entirely of string quartet arrangements. Eight of the ten songs are about each of the schools of magic as described in the rules to the Dungeons & Dragons fantasy role-playing game. The album was named winner of the 2006 Polaris Music Prize. Uncomfortable with receiving a prize sponsored by a mobile phone conglomerate, Pallett gave the money away to bands Pallett liked who needed financial assistance.

In July 2007, Pallett was interviewed on the CBC Radio One program Q, about their upcoming album, to be titled Heartland, which was to have a theme of nothingness.

In 2007, the song "This Is The Dream of Win & Regine" was used in a commercial for Wiener Stadtwerke without Pallett's permission. Instead of litigation, Pallett and their booking agent Susanne Herrndorf approached the company for sponsorship for a music festival of their curation. The resultant Maximum Black Festival featured Final Fantasy, The Dirty Projectors, Deerhoof, Frog Eyes, Max Tundra, Six Organs of Admittance and others. It played Vienna, Berlin and London. In September 2007 they did a Take-Away Show acoustic video session shot by Vincent Moon.

In October 2007 Final Fantasy released a vinyl 7" on Tomlab's Alphabet Single series (The Letter "X"). The two tracks on "X", recorded in Montreal with Zach Condon, of the band Beirut; predate the album He Poos Clouds. The tracks – "Hey Dad" and "What Do You Think Will Happen Next?" are both played regularly at live shows. The song "Hey Dad" contains a melody borrowed from the Nintendo video game "Super Mario Bros. 3"; specifically it is the music from the "Coin Heaven" bonus/hidden stages. Also, the song is quite similar in melody, lyrics and tone to another of Pallett's songs – "→".

In March 2008, Owen Pallett under the alias Final Fantasy, collaborated with Grizzly Bear's Ed Droste on a cover of Björk's "Possibly Maybe" as part of Stereogum's tribute to Björk's album, Post. On their Final Fantasy releases, Pallett has collaborated with Leon Taheny, who is credited as drummer and engineer.

In Fall 2008, Pallett released two EPs. The first one, Spectrum, 14th Century, was a collaboration with Beirut. The second EP, Plays To Please, was a tribute to fellow Torontonian Alex Lukashevsky and his group Deep Dark United. On it, six Lukashevsky originals were reconfigured for a 35-piece big band, the Toronto-based St. Kitts Orchestra (which includes Drumheller's Nick Fraser, Paul Mathew of the Hidden Cameras, and a whistling Andrew Bird, among others).

On December, 2009, Pallett began performing and recording under their own name. The album Heartland was released on Domino Records on January 12, 2010. It was mixed by New York producer Rusty Santos. Also Pallett played Primavera Sound Festival 2010. In August 2010, Pallett released a four track EP entitled A Swedish Love Story on September 28 via Domino. The tracks received substantial airplay on community radio. Following the release of Heartland, Pallett has toured with guitarist/percussionist Thomas Gill and more recently with their former collaborators in Les Mouches, Rob Gordon and Matt Smith.

On November 12, 2012, Pallett tweeted that Pallett had been working on a new album called In Conflict. The album, their fourth full-length recording, was released May 27, 2014.

In live performances, Pallett plays the violin into a loop pedal. Pallett uses Max/MSP and SooperLooper to do multi-phonic looping, which sends their violin signal to amplifiers across the stage.

Other contributions 

Pallett's previous projects included a 3-piece Toronto-based band, Les Mouches, now defunct. Pallett also played fiddle for a short time with the Celtic rock band Enter the Haggis. Pallett was once the violinist of another Toronto band called Picastro, and briefly played keyboard in SS Cardiacs (with Leon Taheny, Jessie Stein and Michael Small in 2005). Pallett has also recorded and toured with Jim Guthrie, The Hidden Cameras, Royal City, The Vinyl Cafe, Gentleman Reg, and Arcade Fire (they co-wrote the strings arrangement for their albums Funeral and Neon Bible). One of their songs, "This Is the Dream of Win & Regine", was inspired by the principal members of the latter group, Win Butler and Régine Chassagne, and is a play on a Dntel song called, "(This Is) The Dream of Evan and Chan."

Pallett contributed remixes for the bands Stars, Grizzly Bear and Death from Above 1979. Pallett also wrote string arrangements for the Canadian bands Immaculate Machine, on their 2007 album, Fables, and Fucked Up, on their 2006 album Hidden World. Pallett also wrote the string arrangements for the Beirut album The Flying Club Cup, as well as provided vocals for the track "Cliquot". Most recently, Pallett provided orchestration for the side project of Arctic Monkeys frontman Alex Turner and former Rascals frontman Miles Kane, as The Last Shadow Puppets, entitled The Age of the Understatement. Pallett also conducted the London Metropolitan Orchestra in the recording of this project.

In June 2009 at Luminato, Toronto's annual festival of arts and creativity, Pallett provided part of the live soundtrack for the outdoor screening (at Yonge-Dundas Square) of the 1919 silent German horror film Tales of the Uncanny (Unheimliche Geschichten), alongside Canadian instrumental band Do Make Say Think and electronica music artist Robert Lippok from Berlin, Germany.

Pallett recorded with Arcade Fire in 2010 while they were making their 2010 album The Suburbs. It later received a Grammy Award for Album of the Year.

In 2009, Pallett worked with Win Butler and Régine Chassagne on the score for Richard Kelly's film The Box. Pallett was also initially set to score Rabbit Hole, a film by John Cameron Mitchell, but in the end the film was scored by Anton Sanko. In late 2010, Pallett was named as composer for T Magazine's "Fourteen Actors Acting" project; Pallett received, alongside the producers of that series, an Emmy Award for "New Approaches to News & Documentary Programming: Arts, Lifestyle and Culture".

Pallett collaborated with John Darnielle of The Mountain Goats in 2012 when several songs from the Transcendental Youth album were performed in concert with the all-female vocal quartet Anonymous 4 and featured Pallett's arrangements for piano, guitar and voices.

Pallett scored the 2013 film The Wait directed by M Blash.

Pallett's string arrangements are featured on the songs Wear and Trust from the 2021 album Ignorance by The Weather Station.

Personal life 

Pallett was born in Mississauga, Ontario and grew up in Milton. Pallett received an Honours Bachelor of Music for Composition from the University of Toronto in 2002.  Pallett is gay, identifies as gender-queer and uses gender-neutral pronouns. Pallett's favorite album is Xiu Xiu's A Promise.

Discography

With Les Mouches 
 The Polite Album (CD-R) – 2002
 Blood Orgy!!! (EP) – 2003
 You're Worth More to Me Than 1000 Christians – 2004 (rereleased via Orchid Tapes in 2015)

Solo work

Studio albums 
 Has a Good Home (as Final Fantasy) – February 12, 2005
 He Poos Clouds (as Final Fantasy) – May 15, 2006
 Heartland – January 11, 2010
 In Conflict – May 27, 2014
 Island - May 22, 2020

Soundtrack albums 
 Spaceship Earth (Original Motion Picture Soundtrack) - May 22, 2020
 Her (Original Score) (with Arcade Fire) - March 19, 2021

EPs 
 Young Canadian Mothers (as Final Fantasy) – March 10, 2006
 Spectrum, 14th Century (as Final Fantasy) – September 30, 2008
 Plays to Please (as Final Fantasy) – October 2008
 A Swedish Love Story EP – September 28, 2010

Singles 
 "Many Lives → 49 MP" (as Final Fantasy) – May 29, 2006
 "Alphabet Series: X" (as Final Fantasy) – October 2007
 "Lewis' Dream" (Flora Advert) – February 25, 2008
 "Lewis Takes Action" – January 2010
 "Lewis Takes Off His Shirt" – March 29, 2010
 "Julia/Tiberius" (with Daphni) – April 25, 2014

Various songs 
 "Joys" – appears on Worried Noodles (2007), a compilation of David Shrigley's lyrics set to music.
 "Flare Gun" – appears on #8: SPAM (2007), a compilation released by Esopus.
 "Possibly Maybe" – duet with Ed Droste of Grizzly Bear. Appears on the Stereogum compilation album, Enjoyed (2008), a tribute to Björk's Post.
 "The Donor" – appears on Crayon Angel: A Tribute to the Music of Judee Sill (2009).
 "Red Sun (demo version)" – appears on Friends in Bellwoods II (2009).
 "Hard to Explain" – appears on the Stereogum compilation Stroked (2011), a tribute to The Strokes debut album Is This It.
 "The Phone Call" – appears on ADULT SWIM SINGLES 2015 (2015).
 "Transformer (Guitar Demo)" – appears on the unlimited free milkshakes compilation Art Week 2016 (2016).

Other contributions

References

External links 

 Official website
 
 

1979 births
Living people
Arcade Fire members
Canadian composers
Canadian indie pop musicians
Canadian indie rock musicians
Canadian music arrangers
Canadian rock violinists
Canadian singer-songwriters
Canadian LGBT songwriters
Canadian LGBT singers
Musicians from Mississauga
Musicians from Toronto
Music copyists
Polaris Music Prize winners
Canadian gay musicians
University of Toronto alumni
Domino Recording Company artists
21st-century violinists
20th-century Canadian LGBT people
21st-century Canadian LGBT people
Non-binary singers
Non-binary composers
Non-binary songwriters